Lal Americayil is a 1989 Indian Malayalam-language comedy film directed by Sathyan Anthikkad and written by Cochin Haneefa. The film stars Mohanlal, Prem Nazir, Jagathy Sreekumar, Disco Santhi, and Haneefa. The soundtrack and musical score was composed by Johnson.

Plot
Ravi Varma, a rich businessman settled in America, pines for his son Babu, lost at the age of 5. His blind wife had also died the day he lost Babu. With the help of his friend Unnithan & attorney Ravindran, he fakes his death & publishes an ad looking for his son. 3 people show up claiming to be Babu. All 3 of them pass all the tests Ravi Varma, Unnithan & Ravindran throw at them, leaving them confused as to who the real Babu is.

Cast
Mohanlal as Vinod, CBI officer
Prem Nazir as Varma
Jagathy Sreekumar
Disco Santhi
Cochin Haneefa
Jose Prakash
Sathaar
Oduvil Unnikrishnan
Saritha
Shanavas as Babu

Soundtrack
The music was composed by Johnson and lyrics was written by Poovachal Khader.

References

External links
 
 Lal Americayil movie on YouTube

1989 films
1980s Malayalam-language films